Nsimba Webster (born January 27, 1996) is an American football wide receiver and return specialist for the Chicago Bears of the National Football League (NFL). He played college football at Eastern Washington and signed with the Los Angeles Rams as an undrafted free agent in 2019.

College career
Webster played at Eastern Washington from 2015 to 2018. During his career with the Eagles, Webster totaled 156 receptions, 2233 receiving yards and 18 touchdowns. His senior season in 2018 was his most productive, when he had 84 receptions, 1379 yards and 11 touchdowns.

Professional career

Los Angeles Rams
After going undrafted in the 2019 NFL Draft, Webster was signed by the Los Angeles Rams as a free agent on April 27 and made the team's initial 53-man roster. However, Webster was not active for any of the Rams' first five games. Webster was then waived on October 12, but then re-signed to the team's practice squad on October 14. He was promoted to the active roster on November 16, 2019. He was waived on July 20, 2021.

San Francisco 49ers
On July 21, 2021, Webster was claimed off waivers by the San Francisco 49ers. He was waived on August 31, 2021.

Chicago Bears
On September 1, 2021, Webster was claimed off waivers by the Chicago Bears. He was waived on October 5, 2021 and re-signed to the practice squad. He signed a reserve/future contract with the Bears on January 11, 2022.

On August 30, 2022, Webster was waived by the Bears and signed to the practice squad the next day. He signed a reserve/future contract on January 9, 2023.

References

External links
Los Angeles Rams bio
Eastern Washington Eagles bio

1996 births
Living people
American football wide receivers
People from Antioch, California
Players of American football from California
Sportspeople from the San Francisco Bay Area
American football return specialists
Eastern Washington Eagles football players
Los Angeles Rams players
San Francisco 49ers players
Chicago Bears players